Cricket Tasmania (formerly the Tasmanian Cricket Association) is the administrative body for cricket in Tasmania, Australia, and they are based at Bellerive Oval.

Cricket Tasmania's primary purpose is to promote and develop the game of cricket in Tasmania, run junior and educational programmes and competitions and administer the Tasmanian Grade Cricket competitions.

Cricket Tasmania is also responsible for the selection and administration of Tasmania's first class cricket team, the Tasmanian Tigers are part of the Association. They compete in the Sheffield Shield, the Australian first-class competition, and the Ford Ranger Cup, the Australian one-day competition, and the domestic Twenty20 competition.

The current president of Cricket Tasmania (CT) is Glenn Gillies, and the current chairman is Tony Harrison, and he presides over a board which oversees all the activities of the TCA, and cricket in Tasmania. CT has over 100 staff and is responsible for 159 cricket clubs, and over 14,000 registered players.

The Southern Tasmanian Cricket association was formed in the 1850s and was renamed as the Tasmanian Cricket Association (TCA) in 1906. The TCA then began trading as Cricket Tasmania from September 2009. Originally based at the TCA Ground on Hobart's Queens Domain, the TCA relocated to Bellerive Oval in 1977, and now houses modern facilities as well as the museum of Tasmanian Cricket within Cricket Tasmania headquarters at the ground.

See also

History of Women's Cricket in Australia
Lily Poulett-Harris

References

External links

Tasmania
Cric
 
1906 establishments in Australia
Sports organizations established in 1906